The following is a list of recurring Saturday Night Live characters and sketches introduced during the forty-third season of SNL, which began on September 30, 2017.

Marketing Campaign
A woman (Cecily Strong) and her significant other, played by the host, react angrily when they realize that their favorite restaurant is instead just the new campaign for a fast food restaurant.

Angel, Every Boxer's Girlfriend from Every Movie About Boxing Ever
Heidi Gardner plays Angel, a stereotypical girlfriend of a boxer, who appears on Weekend Update to give their "Good News Report". Angel will tell Michael Che that she is upset her boyfriend is "fighting again" and then expresses frustration with each piece of good news Michael asks her to comment on, such as a rise in holiday spending or the Royal Wedding. Her sketches occasionally make mention of the Boston area, such as her sister's address being "555 Whitey Bulger Way." Angel's catchphrase is "I'm taking the kids to my sisters", said as an ultimatum if her boyfriend fights again or if something else angering her does not go her way.

Fresh Takes
A high school live news show hosted by three students and one teacher, played by the host. The teacher is disturbingly up-to-date on all the teenage gossip.

Lazlo Holmes
Lazlo Holmes (Chance the Rapper), a basketball correspondent, is forced to cover games that he doesn't have knowledge about.

In addition to the SNL sketches, Chance the Rapper also plays Holmes in web-exclusive interviews of hockey players on the official NHL YouTube channel.

Sexual Harassment Charlie
At an office, a worker (played by the host) is being fired and insulted by their co-workers for allegedly inappropriate remarks, but Charlie (Kenan Thompson) is beloved by office workers, despite consistently saying extremely over-the-top comments.

Cousin Mandy
An off-kilter woman, Mandy (Heidi Gardner), reunites with her famous cousins.

The Science Room
A science show host, played by the host(s), struggles to explain scientific concepts to two unintelligent kids Lonnie (Cecily Strong) and Josh (Mikey Day).

Dog Head Man 
A scientist (played by Mikey Day)'s latest cutting-edge project, a dog's head on a human body, confuses investors.

Bailey Gismert
Teenage film critic Bailey Gismert (Heidi Gardner) reviews movies on Weekend Update. She is extremely ditzy and overemotional, and she tends to harbor nonsensical crushes on inappropriate movie characters (such as Pikachu) under the impression that they are real people.

Dinner Discussion 
A group of friends (Kenan Thompson, Kate McKinnon, Aidy Bryant, Beck Bennett and the host) eating at a restaurant overreact when a woman (played by Heidi Gardner) brings up a divisive political topic.

Big Nick's
A man, initially played by Pete Davidson, and later by Andrew Dismukes, while accompanied by his friend (Chris Redd), asks business owner Big Nick (John Mulaney) to do something that is socially frowned upon. As a consequence, an ensemble, including both humans and anthropomorphic objects, join Big Nick in singing versions of songs from musicals.

Mattel Instagram Pitch
Three interns, played by Pete Davidson, Heidi Gardner, and the host, pitch Instagram captions to Mattel employees, played by Kenan Thompson and Cecily Strong, that escalate in bizarreness.

References 

Lists of recurring Saturday Night Live characters and sketches
Saturday Night Live in the 2010s